In mathematical logic, a Hintikka set is a set of logical formulas whose elements satisfy the following properties:

 An atom or its conjugate can appear in the set but not both,
 If a formula in the set has a principle operator that is of "conjuctive-type", then its two operands appear in the set,
 If a formula in the set has a principle operator that is of "disjuntive-type", then at least one of its two operands appears in the set.
The exact meaning of "conjuctive-type" and "disjunctive-type" is defined by the method of semantic tableaux.

Hintikka sets arise when attempting to prove completeness of propositional logic using semantic tableaux. They are named after Jaakko Hintikka.

References

Mathematical logic